The MPI MP20B is a diesel-electric locomotive designed and built by MotivePower in Boise, Idaho.

Specifications
It has a  MTU-Detroit Diesel 12V4000 engine. It weighs approximately 277,000 lb and is 59 ft 2 in long. It also includes a B-B wheel arrangement and an optional dynamic brake.

Union Pacific MP20Bs were powered by a Caterpillar 3516C.

Owners

References

B-B locomotives
Diesel-electric locomotives of the United States
EPA Tier 2-compliant locomotives of the United States
MPI locomotives

Railway locomotives introduced in 2007
Standard gauge locomotives of the United States